Ya nunca más may refer to:

 Ya nunca más (film), a 1984 Mexican musical film
 Ya nunca más (album), the soundtrack album for the film